Alfred Thomas Müller (born 12 January 1939 in Leipzig) is a German conductor, composer and pianist. He won the 1988 Handel Prize presented by the city of Halle.

Works

Orchestra and chamber ensemble 
 flares (1979/80)
 picture for orchestra (1983/84)
 Spuren (1986)
 Epiphanie (1993/94)
 Entasis II (2001)
 Scheidt-Adaptionen (1991)

Solo instrument with orchestra 
 Konzert für Klavier und Kammerorchester (1984)

Choir 
 Motette (2003)

Organ 
 Credo quia absurdum (1991)

Chamber music 
 Streichquartett Nr. 1 (1973/74)
 Streichquartett Nr. 2 (1976/77)
 Konzentrationen (1981)
 Einblicke – Ausblicke (1982)
 Proteus (1985)
 Maqam (1987)
 Kalamos (1990)
 Drei Fragmente (1975/1993)
 Streichquartett Nr. 3 (1993)
 Ataraxia (1997/98)
 Entasis I (2000)
 Der Himmer berührt die Erde (2002)

Solo instruments 
 Profile (1978)
 Solo mit Händel (1986)
 Die Posaunen der sieben Engel (1987)
 Vibrationen (1987)
 tuba sola (1989)
 Anamesis (1990)
 Correspondance (1992)
 Calls (1992)
 Fatum (1995)
 Paian (1996)
 Vier Gesänge nach Rimbaud (1981)
 Altjapanische Gesänge (1995/96)
 Canticum cecebratio (1994)
 DEUTSCHLAND – Ein Wintermärchen (1995)
 Hommage a la Femme (2002)

Notes

References

Sources

Further reading 
 Stefan Amzoll: Alfred Thomas Müller. In Komponisten der Gegenwart (KDG). Edition Text & Kritik, Munich 1996, .
 Müller, Thomas. In Wilfried W. Bruchhäuser: Komponisten der Gegenwart im Deutschen Komponisten-Interessenverband. Ein Handbuch. 4th edition, Deutscher Komponisten-Interessenverband, Berlin 1995, .

External links 
 
 Internetpräsenz von Thomas Müller
 Alfred Thomas Müller on Munzinger-Archiv
 

20th-century German composers
20th-century classical composers
German conductors (music)
German classical pianists
Male classical pianists
Academic staff of Otto von Guericke University Magdeburg
Handel Prize winners
1939 births
Living people
Musicians from Leipzig
20th-century German male musicians